Brian Dabul and Sergio Roitman were the defending champions, but Roitman retired from the professional tennis in 2009.
Dabul partners up with Carlos Berlocq and they won this tournament, by defeating Jorge Aguilar and Federico del Bonis 6–3, 6–2 in the final.

Seeds

Draw

Draw

External links
 Main Draw

Copa Petrobras Buenos Aires - Doubles
Copa Petrobras Buenos Aires